Bernbaum is a variation of German surname Birnbaum. Notable people with the surname include:

 Ernest Bernbaum (1879–1958)
 Gerald Bernbaum (born 1936), educationist and university administrator

See also
Berenbaum

German-language surnames
Ashkenazi surnames
Yiddish-language surnames